"ASAP" is a song by American hip hop recording artist T.I., released on May 24, 2005, as the third single from his third album, Urban Legend (2004). The song was featured on the soundtrack to the 2005 video game, Midnight Club 3: DUB Edition. The song was officially remixed, featuring guest verses from T.I's Pimp Squad Click cohorts, Big Kuntry King and Mac Boney. The song is considered a diss track towards Houston-based rapper, Lil' Flip.

Chart performance
"ASAP" peaked at number 75 on the US Billboard Hot 100 and spent a total of eight weeks on the chart. The song also peaked at number 18 on the US Hot R&B/Hip-Hop Songs charts. Its B-Side song "Motivation" peaked at number 62 on the US Hot R&B/Hip-Hop Songs chart. On June 14, 2006, the song was certified gold by the Recording Industry Association of America (RIAA) for sales of over 500,000 copies in the United States.

Charts

Weekly charts

ASAP

Motivation

Year-end charts

ASAP

Certifications

References

2004 songs
2005 singles
T.I. songs
Grand Hustle Records singles
Songs written by T.I.
Diss tracks